C. nitidus may refer to:
 Calymmaderus nitidus, a beetle species
 Carpodectes nitidus, the snowy cotinga, a bird species found in Costa Rica, Honduras, Nicaragua and Panama
 Cimolodon nitidus, a mammal species from the Upper Cretaceous of North America
 Copelatus nitidus, a diving beetle species
 Ctenopharynx nitidus, a fish species found in Malawi, Mozambique and Tanzania

See also 
 Nitidus (disambiguation)